Raynier Raymond Fernandes (born 19 February 1996) is an Indian professional footballer who plays as a midfielder for Indian Super League club Odisha, on loan from Mumbai City and the India national team.

Career
Born in Mumbai, Fernandes began his career with Air India. He stayed with the club, playing in the MDFA Elite Division, until 2016. He also represented Maharashtra in the Santosh Trophy in 2016.

Mohun Bagan
On 5 August 2016 it was announced that Fernandes had signed with Mohun Bagan of the I-League. He made his debut for the first-team of Mohun Bagan not long after signing on 10 August in their Calcutta Football League opener against George Telegraph. He then made his professional debut for the club in the I-League on 13 January 2017 against Shillong Lajong. He started and played 69 minutes as Mohun Bagan won 2–0.

Odisha
In June 2022, Fernandes moved to Odisha on loan from fellow Indian Super League club Mumbai City. On 17 August, he made his debut for the club against NorthEast United in the Durand Cup, in a thumping 6–0 win.

International career
On 5 June 2019, he made his senior international debut for India in a 3–1 defeat against Curaçao at the 2019 King's Cup in Thailand.

Career statistics

Club

International

Honours

India
 King's Cup third place: 2019

References

External links

Living people
People from Maharashtra
Indian footballers
Air India FC players
Mohun Bagan AC players
Association football midfielders
Footballers from Mumbai
Calcutta Football League players
I-League players
1996 births
India international footballers
Maharashtra football team players
Mumbai City FC players
Indian Super League players